Elena Buzinova (born 27 March 1989) is a Belarusian footballer who plays as a midfielder for Belarusian Premier League club Bobruichanka Bobruisk. She has been a member of the Belarus women's national team.

References

1989 births
Living people
Women's association football midfielders
Belarusian women's footballers
Sportspeople from Vitebsk
Belarus women's international footballers
Bobruichanka Bobruisk players
Universitet Vitebsk players